The Viper is a 1965 Soviet drama film directed by Viktor Ivchenko.

Plot 
The film tells about the brave daughter of a merchant who decides to join the Red Army.

Cast 
 Ninel Myshkova
 Boris Seidenberg
 Ivan Mykolaichuk
 Rayisa Nedashkivs'ka
 Aleksandr Movchan
 Konstantin Stepankov	
 Sergei Lyakhnitsky
 Vladimir Dalsky		
 Anna Nikolayeva
 Malvina Shvidler

References

External links 
 

1965 films
1960s Russian-language films
Soviet drama films
1965 drama films